Thomas Sanderson may refer to:

 Thomas Sanderson (poet) (1759–1829), English writer based in Cumberland
 Thomas Sanderson (Saskatchewan politician) (1849–1922), Scottish-born farmer and political figure in Saskatchewan
 Thomas Sanderson (Wisconsin politician) (1827–1912), American farmer and politician in Wisconsin
 Thomas Kemp Sanderson (1821–1897), English corn merchant and politician
 Thomas Sanderson, 1st Baron Sanderson (1841–1923), British civil servant
 Thomas Sanderson (priest), English Anglican priest